Toogong is a town in the Central West region of New South Wales, Australia. By 2016 this number had fallen to 79.

Toogong is an aboriginal word meaning 'Dried up Lake.'

Toogong was the birthplace of Hazelton Airlines, formed by Jim and Max Hazelton in 1953, now Regional Express.

Built in 1872, St. Albans Anglican church in Toogong is the oldest still existing church in the Canowindra district and National Trust listed. The church was built with the financial support of the Irvine family who had emigrated to Australia from Northern Ireland and had built an inn and post office at Toogong in 1863. Apart from being a house of worship it was also used for schooling. The two remaining Irvine brothers of the original five also erected a war memorial in the church grounds in 1924 to honour the men from the district who saw active war service.

A school was operated at Toogong from 1922 to 1967 in a dedicated school house, now disused but still preserved.

Toogong was once a stop at the Cobb and Co stagecoach line from Orange to Forbes.

References

External links

Towns in New South Wales
Towns in the Central West (New South Wales)